is a Japanese manga series written and illustrated by Naoki Mizuguchi. It was serialized in Shogakukan's seinen manga magazine Weekly Big Comic Spirits from August 2016 to October 2019, with its chapters collected in ten tankōbon volumes.

Publication
Saotome Senshu, Hitakakusu is written and illustrated by Naoki Mizuguchi. It was serialized in Shogakukan's seinen manga magazine Weekly Big Comic Spirits from August 22, 2016 to October 21, 2019. Shogakukan collected its chapters in ten tankōbon volumes, released from December 12, 2016 to November 12, 2019.

The manga is licensed in France by Doki-Doki.

Volume list

References

External links
 

Boxing in anime and manga
Romantic comedy anime and manga
Seinen manga
Shogakukan manga